Genevieve Knight Hannelius (born December 22, 1998) is an American actress, singer, and YouTube personality who made her acting debut starring as Courtney Patterson on the ABC series Surviving Suburbia (2009). She had recurring roles on the Disney Channel series Sonny with a Chance (2009–2010) and Good Luck Charlie (2010–2011), and soon received recognition for her role as Avery Jennings in the Disney Channel sitcom Dog with a Blog (2012–2015). She has also voiced Rosebud in the Air Buddies film series (2011–2013), for which she won a Young Artist Award in 2012 and starred as Christa Carlyle in the crime series American Vandal (2017).

Early life
Hannelius was born in Boston, Massachusetts to Eric and Karla Hannelius. Her father is Swedish. She moved to Yarmouth, Maine at age three, and then moved to Los Angeles at the age of nine with her family to pursue acting. She is an alumna of the Los Angeles-based Young Actor's Studio. She graduated from Sierra Canyon High School in May 2017. In January 2022, Hannelius moved to New York City, New York.

Acting career
As a child, Hannelius had roles in theater, which include playing Madeline in the Children's Theater of Maine's production of Madeline's Rescue in summer 2006 and Jenny in Tales of a Fourth Grade Nothing with Children's Theatre of Maine and Maine State Music Theater. She began acting portraying Courtney Patterson on the sitcom Surviving Suburbia, playing the daughter of Bob Saget's character.Hannelius had a recurring role on Sonny with a Chance, a Disney Channel original series as Dakota Condor, a guest role on Hannah Montana as a fan named Tiffany and a recurring role on Good Luck Charlie as Jo Keener. She also played Emily Pearson in the Disney Channel original film Den Brother in 2010. and voiced the character Rosebud in Spooky Buddies, for which she won a Young Artist Award; she reprised the role in its sequels Treasure Buddies and Super Buddies.

In February 2011, she was cast for a lead role in the pilot of the High School Musical spin-off series Madison High, however the pilot was not picked up to series. In 2012, Hannelius was cast as Avery Jennings on the Disney Channel series Dog with a Blog, which premiered in October of that same year, and ran until 2015; on average, it attained millions of viewers per episode. In 2014, she guest starred as Mad Mack on the Disney Channel series Jessie, and voiced Lady Joy on the Disney Junior series Sofia the First.

In 2017, Hannelius starred as Christina Carlyle in the Netflix mockumentary crime series American Vandal, which received critical acclaim, and earned a Primetime Emmy Award nomination. In 2019, she starred in an online interactive series titled "Timeline". In 2020, she starred as Heather in the direct-to-video horror film Day 13. She will next star in the upcoming comedy film Sid is Dead.

Other ventures
Hannelius is an avid supporter of the domestic violence charity organization A Window Between Worlds, and has been hosting its annual fundraising event, "Art in the Afternoon", since 2013.

In November 2014, it was announced that Hannelius was launching a customized nail-wrap app titled "Make Me Nails". Hannelius stated that she was inspired to create the app because "I wanted to make nail art more accessible for young people. I was doing my own nail-art tutorials, and I could see that my fans were recreating my designs, and that was so cool to me. I wanted to take that to the next level and really give them something more personal." In 2019, Hannelius created G Polish, a brand of cruelty-free vegan nail polish.

Filmography

Film

Television

Discography

Awards and nominations

References

External links

1998 births
21st-century American actresses
21st-century American singers
21st-century American women singers
Actresses from Boston
American child actresses
American child singers
American people of Swedish descent
American stage actresses
American television actresses
American voice actresses
Living people
Sierra Canyon School alumni